Riglos may refer to:

Places

Las Peñas de Riglos, municipality in the province of Huesca, Spain
Miguel Riglos, town in La Pampa Province in Argentina

People

Ana Estefanía Dominga Riglos (1788–1869), Argentine patriot, wife of Matías de Irigoyen
Master of Riglos (died circa 1460), Spanish Gothic painter
Miguel de Riglos Bástida (1649–1719), Spanish nobleman, merchant, and Captain in the fort of Buenos Aires

Other

Bodega Riglos, Argentine producer of premium wines
Mallos de Riglos, a set of conglomerate rock formations in the municipality of Las Peñas de Riglos